The 2013 Georgia State Panthers football team represented Georgia State University (GSU) in the 2013 NCAA Division I FBS football season. The Panthers were led by first year head coach Trent Miles and played their home games at the Georgia Dome. The 2013 season was the Panthers' first in the Sun Belt Conference and at the FBS level. As a result of this transition, the Panthers were ineligible to play in a bowl game regardless of their final record (0–12).

Schedule

Season notes
After the loss to Chattanooga in the second week of the season, running back coach Tony Tiller was reassigned to a different position within the athletic department, being replaced by former Indiana State player and graduate assistant Brock Lough.

Coaching staff

Roster

References

Georgia State
Georgia State Panthers football seasons
College football winless seasons
Georgia State Panthers football